"I'm Real" is the name of two songs recorded by American actress and singer Jennifer Lopez, both primarily for her second studio album J.Lo (2001). The original song was released as the album's fourth single; Ja Rule of Murder Inc. Records wrote and was featured on a newly-written song with completely different lyrics and production titled "I'm Real (Murder Remix)", which was featured on a re-issue of J.Lo in July 2001, on Lopez's remix album J to tha L–O! The Remixes (2002), and on Ja Rule's third studio album Pain Is Love (2001).

The original album track was well received by music critics, who complimented the 1980s-esque style and composition, while the "Murder Remix" received mixed reviews for its lyrics. However, both songs have been appreciated for the use of the samples.

The "Murder Remix" topped the Billboard Hot 100 for five non-consecutive weeks, beginning September 8, 2001, and also topped the Hot 100 Airplay chart. The two songs are essentially different songs with the same title. Much controversy followed the song after its release. Two music videos were made for the tracks, with the first depicting Lopez driving a motorcycle throughout the highway and featuring a dance break, while the second video features Ja Rule and Irv Gotti.

Background and release
The original version of "I'm Real" was recorded by Lopez for her second studio album, J.Lo (2001) which had 14 other tracks. Released on January 23, 2001, J.Lo became a commercial success, debuting at the summit of the Billboard 200. Describing J.Lo as a "reflection of who I am, my own experiences", Lopez said: "My fans call me J.Lo. Giving the album this title is my way of telling them that this is for them in appreciation of their support." Prior to its release, she knew how important it was to "stay fresh", and decided to tweak her public image by dying her hair and changing her stage name to J.Lo. Lopez felt that she had more "creative control" on J.Lo than her debut album On the 6 (1999). The album was reissued on July 24, 2001 (Lopez's thirty-second birthday), now containing the remix version of "I'm Real" featuring Ja Rule.

Writing and recording

The original version of "I'm Real" was written by Jennifer Lopez, Troy Oliver, Cory Rooney and Leshan David Lewis, with production being handled by Oliver and Rooney. Lyrically, the singer offers voluptuous good times as long as her lover "don't ask me where I've been." While she brags that she's made him fall in love, a male voice chants, "She's a bad, bad bitch." Oliver developed the song's concept while Lewis suggested the use of a loop from the song "Firecracker" (1978) by Japanese band Yellow Magic Orchestra from their self-titled album. After hearing the instrumental track, Lopez and Rooney wrote "I'm Real", which she said "was the first time I ever wrote a melody. I just love the hook of the song. I wrote it, so it’s kind of personal." Lopez recorded the song that day, and called in her boyfriend at the time Sean Combs to record the lyric, "She's a bad, bad bitch." Rooney revealed: "She wrote that and she had him stop what he was doing, leave his studio, come across town and just go in the vocal booth and say that one part. Then she said, 'OK, now you can leave.'"

Remix
Urban radio stations were disappointed that J. Lo had not produced a single that catered to their audiences, and Epic Records knew that they needed the support of both urban and pop radio. After the album began to decline on the charts, Rooney suggested to Tommy Mottola that the song be remixed, which prompted Mottola to enlist Ja Rule of Murder Inc Records. Ja Rule admitted that he was "thrown" when he heard the song, saying: "I don't do dance music, so what do you want me to do to this?" Though initially enlisted to remix the song, he decided to write a new song with the same title instead, saying: "OK, I don't need to hear that, scratch that, 'cause we're gonna do our own thing" after hearing the original track. Along with Irv Gotti, Ja Rule wrote the Murder remix for "I'm Real", which utilizes samples from "All Night Long" (1983) by Mary Jane Girls and "Mary Jane" by Rick James. "I'm Real (Murder Remix)" was produced by Gotti and 7 Aurelius, and was recorded at Record Plant in Hollywood, California and Crackhouse Studios in New York City. Singer Ashanti recorded the demo version of the remix, and provided background vocals for the final version. Ja Rule opens the remix by screaming "What's my motherfucking name?", to which Lopez responds "R-U-L-E". However, these lyrics resulted in common confusion among listeners, with many having heard "Are you Ellie?" instead.

Following the release of "I'm Real (Murder Remix)", Lopez's personal sound had shifted away from a pure pop sound to more of an R&B/hip hop sound. Ja Rule noted that her audience now wanted a different sound from her, "It's J. Lo now because of 'I'm Real' [...] It's gonna put her in another zone. After this one, they gonna be expecting hot crossover R&B joints from J. Lo. They ain't gonna want the pop version of J. Lo no more, they gonna want the 'I'm Real' version." Rule described it as a "real collaboration" by saying "Sometimes when you do a collaboration with an artist it's not real collaborations [...] 'Send me a reel here. I'll fly it back here.' Me and J. Lo's record was a real collaboration."

Critical response
The song received mostly positive reviews from music critics. Stephen Thomas Erlewine of AllMusic picked the song as one of his "track picks", noting that the song has "hook, but it needs a couple of spins before its catch holds". While saying that the song "sound like it's straight out of 1986", Sal Cinquemani of Slant Magazine called it "a retro pop track reminiscent of Janet Jackson's Control era". Tom Sinclair of Entertainment Weekly called it "a chirpy little synth pop number".

The "Murder Remix" also received favorable reviews from music critics. William Ruhlmann of Allmusic picked the song as one of the best from the album, while Sal Cinquemani of Slant Magazine called it "edgy, often sexy remix", naming it "a significant departure from the retro-hued album version". Ian Wade of Yahoo! Music wrote that "only the Ja Rule assisted 'I'm Real' and 'Ain't It Funny', that makes something vaguely special out of the original versions, Jen'd be better off just hooking up with him for good and they could become a Cristal-sipping, foulmouthed and bling-blinging Sonny & Cher." While reviewing Ja Rule's Pain Is Love album, Soren Baker of Los Angeles Times noted  "I'm Real" to be "one of the album's stronger songs, as Rule's rough voice and Lopez's sugary tones make a surprisingly appealing blend". In 2011, the remix version was named the sixth-biggest duet of all time by Billboard.

Chart performance

United States
"I'm Real" debuted at number 66 on the U.S. Billboard Hot 100 on the week ending July 7, 2001, earning the "Hot Shot Debut of the Week" title and debuting on the Billboard Hot 100 Airplay at number 55. "I'm Real" jumped to number 40 in its second week on the Hot 100 and moved up to number 32 on the Hot 100 Airplay chart. In its third week, the song continued to steadily increase, reaching number 25 on the Hot 100 and 20 on the Hot 100 Airplay chart. By its fourth week, the song had reached the top twenty, fueled by increasing airplay. On September 8, 2001, "I'm Real" replaced Alicia Keys' "Fallin'" as the leader of both the Billboard Hot 100 and Hot 100 Airplay chart. It was the number one song in the United States the day of the September 11 attacks. Rooney recalled: "I didn't get a chance to celebrate the success of "I'm Real" so much because of all that was going on. The focus shifted. I remember it putting a really dark cloud over everything." "I'm Real" spent the next three charting weeks at the summit and was subsequently knocked out of the top spot by "Fallin'", which boasted an additional three consecutive weeks at number one. After three weeks stalled at number two, "I'm Real" returned to number one again for a final two weeks, through October 27, 2001. "I'm Real (Murder Remix)" was a staple on R&B/hip hop and pop radio during the summer and fall of 2001, spending fifteen weeks in the top five of the Billboard Hot 100. In 2009 the single was named the 30th most successful song of the 2000s, on the Billboard Hot 100 Songs of the Decade.

The success of "I'm Real (Murder Remix)", which became the biggest hit of Lopez's career at the time, propelled the album J.Lo from number 90 on the Billboard 200 back to the top ten according to Nielsen SoundScan. The chart position of the Murder Remix was boosted by radio play of the album track, which led to complaints of unfairness and change of Billboard policy in 2002. Afterwards, airplay of identically named songs but with substantially different melodies was not combined when computing chart positions. Rooney stated that the song's success "really pissed off everybody in terms of Billboards rules". Following the release of "Ain't It Funny (Murder Remix)", Chuck Taylor of Billboard noted: "Sony has got to be kidding, calling it "Ain't it Funny" when not one note of it is held in common with the original", calling it a "disturbing trend".

Oceania and Europe
Elsewhere, "I'm Real" was very successful. In Australia, the song debuted at number nine, before moving to number six; becoming its highest peak. After weeks descending the charts, the song eventually climbed once again to number six, remaining at number seven for two further weeks. Finally, the song climbed to number five, on January 6, 2002, before peaking at number three the following week. It was Lopez's highest charting-single since her debut-single "If You Had My Love" (1999). In New Zealand, "I'm Real" debuted at number 44, before peaking at number three for two consecutive weeks, becoming her highest single from 'J.Lo' since "Love Don't Cost a Thing" and the album's third top-ten single.

In Europe, the song continued the success. In the United Kingdom, "I'm Real" became Lopez's sixth top-five single, reaching number four, also becoming her fourth consecutive top-five single from the same album. In France, "I'm Real" debuted at number 90, on December 15, 2001. The song kept climbing, until it reached a peak of number three, on January 12, 2002. It became her highest charting-single in France, until "Get Right" peaked at number two in 2005 and was certified silver by SNEP.

Accolades

Music videos
The music videos for "I'm Real" were both directed by Dave Meyers and followed its release as a single in the United States. The original version's music video depicts Lopez driving a motorcycle in the countryside, with Meyers noting that it "looked very country". Lopez's soon-to-be husband Cris Judd appeared as a dancer in the clip; the video also featured cameo appearances by Ja Rule, Irv Gotti and underwear model Travis Fimmel. According to Meyers, "we finished that video very quickly, turned it around and then shot the remix video." The director said: "We got Ja out there and then Irv shakes his head and goes, 'Nah, this is all wrong.' He's like, 'Dave, check it out: We just remixed the song. This is hot. We need to bring Jennifer and Ja to the hood, not out in the wilderness, not in the reeds.' So  It was a one-day shoot. Then, of course, the remix video was the one that exploded."

The second music video features a variety of settings including a dilapidated house, swimming pool and basketball court. Meyers stated that: "I was really up to capturing the less polished version of the two. The Murder Inc. crew at that time was all about having a good time, and I think Jennifer certainly was infected by that energy as well." Ja Rule described the process of making the remix and filming the video as a "the fastest turnaround probably ever for a record. From the time the record was written to video, it was a two-day spin. It was done that fast." The pink velour Juicy Couture tracksuit worn by Lopez in the Murder remix video became iconic according to Vogue. CNN's Marianna Cerini noted that the tracksuit "created a craze -- and one of the most ubiquitous looks of the decade", with Vogue crediting the music video with putting Juicy Couture, previously a "little-known LA-based brand", "firmly on the map". Complex magazine wrote that the video "completely dominated TRL and pretty much all of MTV with a visual that perfectly encapsulated the '00s aesthetic of a Juicy sweatsuit and big sunglasses."

The Murder remix version won the award for Best Hip-Hop Video at the 2002 MTV Video Music Awards.

Original version

The original video for "I'm Real" begins with Lopez driving down a highway on a motorcycle, passing various smiling children, who stop what they are doing and run after her. Lopez is also seen at a gas station, where she stops and proceeds to walk into the town. Several more people gaze at her as she walks through the town, and she is later seen eating ice cream with children, until she gets back onto her motorcycle and drives back down the highway. A string of children are running after her, and the music stops as she steps up onto a stage set on a hillside; where she goes into a dance-break to "More Bounce to the Ounce" by Zapp. These scenes feature Lopez's second husband, Cris Judd, as a back-up dancer. For the rest of the video, Lopez continues to sing, dance and entertain the crowd on stage as the crowd watch in pleasure. The video also features cameo appearances by Ja Rule and Travis Fimmel.

Murder remix
A separate video clip was shot for the Murder remix of "I'm Real" featuring Ja Rule. It opens with Lopez leaning on a gate of an urban home in Los Angeles and singing in front of a red backdrop along with Ja Rule, who is also seen walking the streets of LA, with a basketball. Men and women are then seen in various locations such as a park and swimming pool. Lopez and Ja Rule are then seen together in a basketball court in the chorus of the song. These locations are shown for a prominent part of the video, until both of them are later at a party; and sitting together at a park watching children play.

Live performances
Lopez and Ja Rule performed the murder remix version of the song at the 2001 MTV Video Music Awards. The song (original version) was included on the set list for her series of Let's Get Loud concerts in 2001, and later appeared on the Let's Get Loud Concert DVD. She sang the original version of the song on NBC's Today in the middle of the Rockefeller Plaza. Lopez performed the "Murder Remix" version of the song as part of her medley during the 2018 MTV Video Music Awards on August 20, 2018, at Radio City Music Hall in New York City.

The song was featured as a sample in Lopez's setlist during the Super Bowl LIV halftime show.

Controversies
Despite the success of "I'm Real", there was controversy over the use of the original single's sample and the structure of the song. The original song contains a sample from Yellow Magic Orchestra's 1978 hit "Firecracker" (an electronic synthpop cover of Martin Denny's 1959 melody of the same name). The "Firecracker" sample was originally planned and licensed to be used for Mariah Carey's "Loverboy". According to the music publisher of "Firecracker", Carey's team called to license a sample of the song, which had never been sampled, months before Lopez's team called to do the same. Carey felt that former husband and music executive at Sony Music (Columbia Records), Tommy Mottola, was interfering with her career by arranging for the sample to go to Lopez. Upset by the conduct of Lopez and her ex-husband, Carey featured a reference to the song on the remix of her single "Loverboy", her first single released by her record company at the time, Virgin Records. The verse can be heard in Da Brat's rap section, where she sings, "Hate on me much as you want to / You can't do what the fuck I do / Bitches be emulating me daily" over the melody of "Firecracker". In 2020, Carey released the original version of "Loverboy", with the "Firecracker" sample on her album The Rarities, released on October 2, 2020.

Irv Gotti, who produced the Murder remix of "I'm Real", openly admitted during an interview with XXL magazine that Mottola contacted him with instructions to create a song that sounded exactly like a song he had made with Carey for the Glitter soundtrack entitled "If We", also featuring Ja Rule.

Furthermore, some in the African American community were outraged by Lopez's use of the racial slur "nigga" in the Murder Remix. She said "I tell them niggas, mind they biz, but they don't hear me, though." A free New York concert drew banner-carrying protesters, angry at the lyrics for "I'm Real".
In response to this, Lopez said in between performances "For anyone to think or suggest that I'm racist is really absurd and hateful to me. The use of the word in the song—it was actually written by Ja Rule—it was not meant to be hurtful to anybody." Ja Rule also responded to this, defending Lopez by stating "I think it's silly [...] I think the whole thing, like everything else, is being blown out of proportion." Rule said that Lopez was not the first Latino to use the word in a song, and that it had not been in an issue previously, adding it was something to let people get a chance to "poke her". Julian Kimble of the website Genius noted in 2016, "Other Latino performers had said the word and ducked the backlash, primarily because their reach didn't compare to Lopez's. To that effect (and apparently unbeknownst to her at the time), the Bronx native's position as world-renowned pop star limited what she could do and say." Kimble observed that her 2002 single "Jenny from the Block" "has always rung like a response to everyone who derided her for the 'I'm Real' remix."

Track listings

European CD single
"I'm Real" (Murder Remix featuring Ja Rule) – 4:22
"I'm Real" (Album Version) – 4:55

Australian CD maxi single 1
"I'm Real" (Murder Remix featuring Ja Rule) – 4:22
"I'm Real" (Radio Edit) – 3:15
"I'm Real" (Dezrok Club Mix) – 9:22
"I'm Real" (Dreem Teem Master) – 4:09
"I'm Real" (Pablo Flores Club Mix) – 9:34
"I'm Real" (Andre Betts Remix) – 3:40

Australian CD maxi single 2
"I'm Real" (Murder Remix featuring Ja Rule) – 4:22
"I'm Real" (Radio Edit) – 3:15
"I'm Real" (Dezrock Vocal Radio Edit) – 3:38
"I'm Real" (Dreem Teem UK Garage Mix) – 5:23
"I'm Real" (D. MD Strong Club) – 10:56
"I'm Real" (Pablo Flores Euro Dub) – 9:39

German CD maxi single
"I'm Real" (Murder Remix featuring Ja Rule) – 4:22
"I'm Real" (Album Version) – 4:57
"I'm Real" (Warren Clarke's Club Mix) – 7:01
"I'm Real" (Dreem Team Master) – 4:09
"I'm Real" (D. MD Strong Club) – 10:55

UK CD maxi single 1
"I'm Real" (Radio Edit) – 3:15
"I'm Real" (Warren Clarke's Club Mix) – 7:00
"Let's Get Loud" – 3:58
"I'm Real" (Video)

UK CD maxi single 2
"I'm Real" (Murder Remix featuring Ja Rule) – 4:22
"I'm Real" (Andre Betts Remix) – 3:56
"I'm Real" (Dezrok Radio Remix) – 3:38
"I'm Real" (Dreem Teem Remix) – 4:06
"I'm Real" (Murder Remix featuring Ja Rule) [Video]

UK Cassette single
"I'm Real" (Radio Edit) – 3:15
"I'm Real" (Murder Remix featuring Ja Rule) – 4:22
"Let's Get Loud" – 3:58

US 7" vinyl
"I'm Real" (Murder Remix featuring Ja Rule) – 4:22
"Love Don't Cost a Thing" – 3:50

French 12" vinyl
"I'm Real" (Murder Remix featuring Ja Rule) – 4:22
"I'm Real" (Album Version) – 4:55
"I'm Real" (Warren Clarke's Club Mix) – 7:00
"I'm Real" (D. MD Strong Club) – 10:55

UK 12" vinyl
"I'm Real" (Murder Remix featuring Ja Rule) – 4:22
"I'm Real" (Andre Betts Remix) –3:56
"I'm Real" (Dreem Teem Remix) – 4:06
"I'm Real" (Warren Clarke's Club Mix) – 7:00
"I'm Real" (Warren Clarke's Instrumental Dub) – 7:28
"I'm Real" (Original Mix) – 4:55

US 12" vinyl
"I'm Real" (Murder Remix featuring Ja Rule) – 4:22
"I'm Real" (Dezrok Club Mix) – 9:23
"I'm Real" (Andre Betts Remix) – 3:37
"I'm Real" (Pablo Flores Club Mix) – 9:33

Credits and personnel
Credits adapted from the liner notes of J.Lo.

 Leshan David Lewis – production, composition
 Ted Jensen – master engineering
 Peter Wade Keusch – Pro Tools
 Tony Maserati – mixing
 Troy Oliver – composition, production, programming, instruments
 Cory Rooney – composition, production
 David Swope – engineering assistance
 Shalene Thomas – background vocals
 Robert Williams – engineering

Murder Remix
Credits adapted from the liner notes of J to tha L–O! The Remixes.

 JD Andrew – engineering assistance
 Seven Aurelius – production
 Jeffrey Atkins – composition, guest vocals
 Milwaukee Buck – engineering
 Tom Coyne – mastering
 Leshan David Lewis – composition
 Eddie Delena – Pro Tools
 Ashanti Douglas – background vocals
 Jay Goin – engineering assistance
 Rick James – composition
 Jennifer Lopez – composition, lead vocals
 Irv Gotti – composition, production, mixing 
 Troy Oliver – composition
 Marty Osterer – bass
 Brian Spencer – mixing
 Brian Springer – engineering

Charts

Weekly charts

Year-end charts

Decade-end charts

All-time charts

Certifications

Release history

References

External links

2001 singles
Jennifer Lopez songs
Ja Rule songs
Billboard Hot 100 number-one singles
Music videos directed by Dave Meyers (director)
Songs written by Cory Rooney
Songs written by Jennifer Lopez
Songs written by Troy Oliver
Song recordings produced by Cory Rooney
Song recordings produced by L.E.S. (record producer)
Epic Records singles
Sampling controversies
Race-related controversies in music